The 2013 American Le Mans Series Monterey was an auto racing event held at Mazda Raceway Laguna Seca, near Monterey, California on May 9–11, 2013.  The four-hour race was the third round of the 2013 American Le Mans Series season.  Germans Klaus Graf and Lucas Luhr defended their 2012 Monterey win with overall victory for Muscle Milk Pickett Racing, while Luhr became the winningest driver in American Le Mans Series history.  Scott Tucker and Marino Franchitti took P2 honors for Level 5 Motorsports, while Mike Gausch and Luis Díaz won the PC category.  Corvette Racing's Jan Magnussen and Antonio García led GT and Henrique Cisneros, Jr. and Nick Tandy won in GTC.

Qualifying

Qualifying result
Pole position winners in each class are marked in bold.

  - The #0 DeltaWing and #66 Porsche were moved to the back of the grid for not using their elected driver during qualifying.
  - The #06 Porsche had its qualifying times disallowed after the car failed post-qualifying technical inspection.

Race

Race result
Class winners in bold.  Cars failing to complete 70% of their class winner's distance are marked as Not Classified (NC).

  - The #17 Porsche failed post-race technical inspection, forfeiting all championship points but still maintaining its finishing position in the race.

References

Monterey
American Le Mans Monterey
American Le Mans Monterey